Komorakata (alternative spelling includes Kumurakata) is a village situated in Hojai district (formerly in Nagaon district) state of Assam, India. According to the 2011 Census of India, it has a population of 3,357. Komorakata village, most of the village population is from Schedule Tribe (ST). It is 6 km away from West Karbi Anglong district. Its PIN code is 782435.

Education

School 

 Komorakata Hing School
 Komorakata Tribal LP School
 Pandit Jivan Ram Barman MV School

College 

 Komorakata Higher Secondary

See also 

 Hojai district
 Doboka

References 

Villages in Hojai district